Ugyen Tshering is a Bhutanese politician who has been a member of the National Assembly of Bhutan, since October 2018. Previously, he was a member of the National Council of Bhutan from 2008 to 2013.

Education
He graduated from the University of Delhi and received a degree of Master of Arts. He also holds a Post Graduate degree in Film Editing and Television Studies.

Political career
Before joining politics, he was a documentarian.

He was elected to the National Council of Bhutan from Paro in the Bhutanese National Council election, 2008.

He was elected to the National Assembly of Bhutan as a candidate of DNT from Lamgong-Wangchang constituency in 2018 Bhutanese National Assembly election. He received 3,566 votes and defeated Phub Tshering, a candidate of Druk Phuensum Tshogpa.

References 

1965 births
Living people
Druk Nyamrup Tshogpa politicians
Bhutanese MNAs 2018–2023
Delhi University alumni
Druk Nyamrup Tshogpa MNAs